The University of Iowa shooting was a mass shooting that occurred in Iowa City, Iowa, on November 1, 1991. Gang Lu, a 28-year-old former graduate student at the University of Iowa, killed three members of the Physics and Astronomy Department faculty, an Associate Vice President for Academic Affairs, and a fellow student, then seriously injured another student working at the university's campus, before committing suicide.

Perpetrator and motives 

Gang Lu ( – November 1, 1991), was a 28-year-old Chinese graduate student at the University of Iowa who had received his doctoral degree in physics and astronomy from the university in May 1991. The 18-year-old Lu began studying physics at Peking University in Beijing, where he passed the CUSPEA exam in 1984 and was admitted to study in the United States, becoming a graduate student at the University of Iowa. As a graduate student, Lu was primarily a loner who was perceived by at least one other graduate student to have a psychological problem if challenged and was reported to have had abusive tantrums. Lu was infuriated because his dissertation, titled Study of the "Critical Ionization Velocity" Effect by Particle-in-Cell Simulation, did not receive the prestigious D. C. Spriestersbach Dissertation Prize, which included a monetary award of $2,500. The Tiananmen Square protests of 1989 led many Chinese students to become eager to stay in the United States, and Lu believed that winning the prize would have made it easier for him to get a job and not have to return to China. Normally, Lu would have gotten a postdoctoral researcher position, but there was not enough money to support him.

In the months prior to the shooting, Lu was still living in Iowa City and wrote five letters explaining the reasons for his planned actions. According to university officials, four of the five letters were written in English and one was written in Chinese, intended to be mailed to news organizations. The letters have never been released to the public.

However, Edwin Chen's book Deadly Scholarship includes a statement by Lu, written in imprecise English, intended to be read after his attack and suicide, which Laura Hamlett characterized as a manifesto; and, in translation, a letter by Lu to his sister.

The shooting 
On Friday, November 1, 1991, Gang Lu attended a meeting for the theoretical space plasma physics research group in a conference room on the third floor of Van Allen Hall at the university's campus. A few minutes after the meeting began, Lu shot three attendees of the meeting with a .38 Special revolver, then proceeded to the second floor to shoot the chairman of the department in his office. Those who were shot in Van Allen Hall were:
 Christoph K. Goertz, professor of physics and astronomy, Lu's dissertation chairperson and one of America's leading theoretical space plasma physicists
 Robert A. Smith, associate professor of physics and astronomy, also on Lu's dissertation committee
 Linhua Shan, a post-doctoral research investigator and the winner of the Spriestersbach prize; Shan had once been Lu's roommate
 Dwight R. Nicholson, chairman of the physics and astronomy department, and one of Lu's dissertation committee members

After the shootings at Van Allen Hall, Lu walked three blocks to Jessup Hall to the office of T. Anne Cleary, an associate vice president for Academic Affairs and grievance officer at the university, and shot her in the head. Lu had filed several grievances about not being nominated for the Spriestersbach prize. Cleary died the following day at the University of Iowa Hospital. Lu then shot Miya Rodolfo-Sioson, a 23-year-old student temporary employee in the Office of Academic Affairs, for unknown reasons. Rodolfo-Sioson survived but was left paralyzed from the neck down, and died from inflammatory breast cancer on December 3, 2008. Lu had intended to kill university president Hunter Rawlings III, but he was attending the Iowa/Ohio State football game in Columbus, Ohio, at the time. Gang Lu was found in room 203 of Jessup Hall with a self-inflicted gunshot wound to the head. Lu died shortly after police arrived.

Media adaptations 
Writer Jo Ann Beard wrote an acclaimed personal essay based in part on the killings. Her essay, entitled "The Fourth State of Matter", was originally published in The New Yorker. It appeared in the 1997 edition of Best American Essays. The essay was later included in her collection of personal essays, The Boys of My Youth. Beard worked as an editor for a physics journal at the university and was a colleague of the victims. She had been close friends with Goertz.

Loosely based on Gang Lu's story, Chinese director Chen Shi-zheng made a feature film, Dark Matter, starring Liu Ye and Meryl Streep. However, the story in Dark Matter has substantial differences in plot and character motivation.  The film won the Alfred P. Sloan Prize at the Sundance Film Festival in 2007.

The educational series Discovering Psychology, "Cultural Psychology" (episode 26, updated edition) discusses Gang Lu (at the 3:50 minute mark) 

A documentary about the life of the lone survivor, Miya Rodolfo-Sioson, entitled Miya of the Quiet Strength, was released in 2009.

References

Further reading

 
 
 
 
 
 
 

1991 mass shootings in the United States
Murder–suicides in Iowa
University and college shootings in the United States
Suicides by firearm in Iowa
Murder in Iowa
1991 in Iowa
1991 murders in the United States
Mass murder in 1991
School massacres in the United States
Deaths by firearm in Iowa
Crimes in Iowa
November 1991 events in the United States
Mass shootings in Iowa
Mass shootings in the United States